The women's 3000 metres steeplechase event at the 2015 European Athletics U23 Championships was held in Tallinn, Estonia, at Kadriorg Stadium on 9 and 11 July.

Medalists

Results

Final
11 July

Heats
9 July

Heat 1

Heat 2

Participation
According to an unofficial count, 28 athletes from 17 countries participated in the event.

References

3000 metres steeplechasechase
Steeplechase at the European Athletics U23 Championships